A Special Mark, as defined by the International Association of Lighthouse Authorities, is a sea mark used in maritime pilotage. It is recognisable by its yellow colour and X, (also referred to as a St. Andrews Cross or saltire) top-mark. It has a distinctive sequence of various flashes that does not match any other navigational mark flashes in its vicinity.

Purpose
Special marks can indicate:
Administrative areas
Water skiing areas
Anchorage areas
Mooring areas
Waiting areas
Marine farms
Oil wells
Dead ends
Pipelines
Spoil ground (an area where dredged material is deposited)
Historic wrecks
Protected areas
Outfall pipes (such as Stormwater, and Cooling water)
Sewerage pipes
Intake pipes
Submarine cables

Other uses
Buoys, such as a Weather buoy or Mooring buoy are coloured yellow or have a yellow light to indicate it is not an aid to navigation.

See also

Navigation
Lateral mark
Cardinal mark
Safe water mark
Isolated danger mark

References

Navigational buoys